A hardware compatibility list (HCL) is a list of computer hardware (typically including many types of peripheral devices) that is compatible with a particular operating system or device management software. In today's world, there is a vast amount of computer hardware in circulation, and many operating systems too. A hardware compatibility list is a database of hardware models and their compatibility with a certain operating system.

HCLs can be centrally controlled (one person or team keeps the list of hardware maintained) or user-driven (users submit reviews on hardware they have used).

There are many HCLs. Usually, each operating system will have an official HCL on its website.

See also 
 System requirements

Software requirements
Computer hardware